The Lakeshore General Hospital (Hôpital général du Lakeshore) (LGH) is a district general hospital in Pointe-Claire, Quebec, a suburban municipality near Montreal, Quebec. The hospital employs 1,599 employees and contains 265 beds, and serves an estimated population of 377,000 in the West Island region of Montreal.

The LGH is situated close to major highway arteries such as Highways 13, 20, 40, and 520 and is often called upon to treat and stabilize accident victims. Its emergency department is one of the busiest for distress cases in Montreal with over 40,000 visits annually.

The Lakeshore General Hospital opened its doors in 1965. It is part of the Centre de santé et de services sociaux de l'Ouest-de-l'Île (West-Island Health and Social Service Centre).

References

External links
 Official website
 The Lakeshore General Hospital Foundation in Montreal, Quebec

Hospital buildings completed in 1965
Hospitals in Montreal
Hospitals established in 1965
Buildings and structures in Pointe-Claire